WindowShade was a control panel extension for the classic Mac OS that allowed a user to double-click a window's title bar to "roll up" the window like a windowshade. When the window was "rolled up", only the title bar of the window was visible; the window's content area disappeared, allowing easier manipulation of the windows on the screen.

History
It debuted in System 7.5, but disappeared in Mac OS 8, when the feature was implemented as a part of the Appearance Manager. A widget was added to the title bar in addition to the double-click method of collapsing a window. The entire feature disappeared with the release of Mac OS X; windows could be minimized to the Dock on the new system or, starting with Mac OS X 10.3, moved aside with Exposé. However, several third-party utilities, such as WindowShade X for Unsanity's Application Enhancer software, have brought the ability back to Mac OS. It has since reappeared as a commercial haxie and offers other features, like translucent windows and minimize-in-place. WindowShade X from Unsanity stopped working in Mac OS 10.7, and other third-party developers have since released applications such as WindowMizer from RGB World that keep the WindowShade feature working on Mac OS X 10.6 and greater.

The WindowShade control panel itself stems from a third-party utility originally written for System 6.0.7 by Rob Johnston. Apple purchased the rights to this software from the developer for use in System 7.5.

Other operating systems
Some window managers for Unix-like operating systems have a similar feature allowing windows to be set to "roll up" when the user double-clicks the title bar of a window. Some window managers provide a titlebar button to access the functionality. While Microsoft Windows does not expose such a feature by default, in some versions if a window is minimized while no taskbar is available, the said window will become a "shade" at the bottom of the screen. An intentional shading implementation for Windows is provided by third-party software vendors.

References

Macintosh operating systems user interface